The Pliocene (also Pleiocene) is the epoch in the geologic time scale that extends from 5.333 million to 2.58 million years ago. It is the second and most recent epoch of the Neogene Period in the Cenozoic Era. The Pliocene follows the Miocene Epoch and is followed by the Pleistocene Epoch. Prior to the 2009 revision of the geologic time scale, which placed the four most recent major glaciations entirely within the Pleistocene, the Pliocene also included the Gelasian Stage, which lasted from 2.588 to 1.806 million years ago, and is now included in the Pleistocene.

As with other older geologic periods, the geological strata that define the start and end are well identified but the exact dates of the start and end of the epoch are slightly uncertain. The boundaries defining the Pliocene are not set at an easily identified worldwide event but rather at regional boundaries between the warmer Miocene and the relatively cooler Pliocene. The upper boundary was set at the start of the Pleistocene glaciations.

Etymology
Charles Lyell (later Sir Charles) gave the Pliocene its name in Principles of Geology (volume 3, 1833).

Subdivisions

In the official timescale of the ICS, the Pliocene is subdivided into two stages. From youngest to oldest they are:

 Piacenzian (3.600–2.58 Ma)
 Zanclean (5.333–3.600 Ma)

The Piacenzian is sometimes referred to as the Late Pliocene, whereas the Zanclean is referred to as the Early Pliocene.

In the system of
 North American Land Mammal Ages (NALMA) include Hemphillian (9–4.75 Ma), and Blancan (4.75–1.6 Ma). The Blancan extends forward into the Pleistocene.
 South American Land Mammal Ages (SALMA) include Montehermosan (6.8–4.0 Ma), Chapadmalalan (4.0–3.0 Ma) and Uquian (3.0–1.2 Ma).

In the Paratethys area (central Europe and parts of western Asia) the Pliocene contains the Dacian (roughly equal to the Zanclean) and Romanian (roughly equal to the Piacenzian and Gelasian together) stages. As usual in stratigraphy, there are many other regional and local subdivisions in use.

In Britain, the Pliocene is divided into the following stages (old to young): Gedgravian, Waltonian, Pre-Ludhamian, Ludhamian, Thurnian, Bramertonian or Antian, Pre-Pastonian or Baventian, Pastonian and Beestonian. In the Netherlands the Pliocene is divided into these stages (old to young): Brunssumian C, Reuverian A, Reuverian B, Reuverian C, Praetiglian, Tiglian A, Tiglian B, Tiglian C1-4b, Tiglian C4c, Tiglian C5, Tiglian C6 and Eburonian. The exact correlations between these local stages and the International Commission on Stratigraphy (ICS) stages is still a matter of detail.

Climate

The beginning of the Pliocene was marked by an increase in global temperatures relative to the cooler Messinian related to the 1.2 million year obliquity amplitude modulation cycle. The global average temperature in the mid-Pliocene (3.3–3 mya) was 2–3 °C higher than today, carbon dioxide levels were the same as today, and global sea level was 25 m higher. The northern hemisphere ice sheet was ephemeral before the onset of extensive glaciation over Greenland that occurred in the late Pliocene around 3 Ma.
The formation of an Arctic ice cap is signaled by an abrupt shift in oxygen isotope ratios and ice-rafted cobbles in the North Atlantic and North Pacific Ocean beds. Mid-latitude glaciation was probably underway before the end of the epoch. The global cooling that occurred during the Pliocene may have spurred on the disappearance of forests and the spread of grasslands and savannas.

Paleogeography

Continents continued to drift, moving from positions possibly as far as 250 km from their present locations to positions only 70 km from their current locations. South America became linked to North America through the Isthmus of Panama during the Pliocene, making possible the Great American Interchange and bringing a nearly complete end to South America's distinctive native ungulate fauna, though other South American lineages like its predatory mammals were already extinct by this point and others like xenarthrans continued to do well afterwards. The formation of the Isthmus had major consequences on global temperatures, since warm equatorial ocean currents were cut off and an Atlantic cooling cycle began, with cold Arctic and Antarctic waters dropping temperatures in the now-isolated Atlantic Ocean.

Africa's collision with Europe formed the Mediterranean Sea, cutting off the remnants of the Tethys Ocean. The border between the Miocene and the Pliocene is also the time of the Messinian salinity crisis.

The land bridge between Alaska and Siberia (Beringia) was first flooded near the start of the Pliocene, allowing marine organisms to spread between the Arctic and Pacific Oceans. The bridge would continue to be periodically flooded and restored thereafter.

Pliocene marine formations are exposed in northeast Spain, southern California, New Zealand, and Italy.

During the Pliocene parts of southern Norway and southern Sweden that had been near sea level rose. In Norway this rise elevated the Hardangervidda plateau to 1200 m in the Early Pliocene. In Southern Sweden similar movements elevated the South Swedish highlands leading to a deflection of the ancient Eridanos river from its original path across south-central Sweden into a course south of Sweden.

Environment and evolution of human ancestors
The Pliocene is bookended by two significant events in the evolution of human ancestors. The first is the appearance of the hominin Australopithecus anamensis in the early Pliocene, around 4.2 million years ago. The second is the appearance of Homo, the genus that includes modern humans and their closest extinct relatives, near the end of the Pliocene at 2.6 million years ago. Key traits that evolved among hominins during the Pliocene include terrestrial bipedality and, by the end of the Pliocene, encephalized brains (brains with a large neocortex relative to body mass and stone tool manufacture.

Improvements in dating methods and in the use of climate proxies have provided scientists with the means to test hypotheses of the evolution of human ancestors. Early hypotheses of the evolution of human traits emphasized the selective pressures produced by particular habitats. For example, many scientists have long favored the savannah hypothesis. This proposes that the evolution of terrestrial bipedality and other traits was an adaptive response to Pliocene climate change that transformed forests into more open savannah. This was championed by Grafton Elliot Smith in his 1924 book, The Evolution of Man, as "the unknown world beyond the trees", and was further elaborated by Raymond Dart as the killer ape theory. Other scientists, such as Sherwood L. Washburn, emphasized an intrinsic model of hominin evolution. According to this model, early evolutionary developments triggered later developments. The model placed little emphasis on the surrounding environment. Anthropologists tended to focus on intrinsic models while geologists and vertebrate paleontologists tended to put greater emphasis on habitats.

Alternatives to the savanna hypothesis include the woodland/forest hypothesis, which emphasizes the evolution of hominins in closed habitats, or hypotheses emphasizing the influence of colder habitats at higher latitudes or the influence of seasonal variation. More recent research has emphasized the variability selection hypothesis, which proposes that variability in climate fostered development of hominin traits. Improved climate proxies show that the Pliocene climate of east Africa was highly variable, suggesting that adaptability to varying conditions was more important in driving hominin evolution than the steady pressure of a particular habitat.

Flora

The change to a cooler, drier, more seasonal climate had considerable impacts on Pliocene vegetation, reducing tropical species worldwide. Deciduous forests proliferated, coniferous forests and tundra covered much of the north, and grasslands spread on all continents (except Antarctica). Tropical forests were limited to a tight band around the equator, and in addition to dry savannahs, deserts appeared in Asia and Africa.

Fauna

Both marine and continental faunas were essentially modern, although continental faunas were a bit more primitive than today. 

The land mass collisions meant great migration and mixing of previously isolated species, such as in the Great American Interchange. Herbivores got bigger, as did specialized predators.

Mammals

In North America, rodents, large mastodons and gomphotheres, and opossums continued successfully, while hoofed animals (ungulates) declined, with camel, deer and horse all seeing populations recede. Three-toed horses (Nannippus), oreodonts, protoceratids, and chalicotheres became extinct. Borophagine dogs and Agriotherium became extinct, but other carnivores including the weasel family diversified, and dogs and short-faced bears did well. Ground sloths, huge glyptodonts, and armadillos came north with the formation of the Isthmus of Panama.

In Eurasia rodents did well, while primate distribution declined. Elephants, gomphotheres and stegodonts were successful in Asia (the largest land mammals of the Pliocene were such proboscideans as Deinotherium, Anancus and Mammut borsoni), and hyraxes migrated north from Africa. Horse diversity declined, while tapirs and rhinos did fairly well. Bovines  and antelopes were successful; some camel species crossed into Asia from North America. Hyenas and early saber-toothed cats appeared, joining other predators including dogs, bears and weasels.

Africa was dominated by hoofed animals, and primates continued their evolution, with australopithecines (some of the first hominins) and baboon-like monkeys such as the Dinopithecus appearing in the late Pliocene. Rodents were successful, and elephant populations increased. Cows and antelopes continued diversification and overtook pigs in numbers of species. Early giraffes appeared. Horses and modern rhinos came onto the scene.  Bears, dogs and weasels (originally from North America) joined cats, hyenas and civets as the African predators, forcing hyenas to adapt as specialized scavengers. Most mustelids in Africa declined as a result of increased competition from the new predators, although Enhydriodon omoensis remained an unusually successful terrestrial predator.

South America was invaded by North American species for the first time since the Cretaceous, with North American rodents and primates mixing with southern forms. Litopterns and the notoungulates, South American natives, were mostly wiped out, except for the macrauchenids and toxodonts, which managed to survive. Small weasel-like carnivorous mustelids, coatis and short-faced bears migrated from the north. Grazing glyptodonts, browsing giant ground sloths and smaller caviomorph rodents, pampatheres, and armadillos did the opposite, migrating to the north and thriving there.

The marsupials remained the dominant Australian mammals, with herbivore forms including wombats and kangaroos, and the huge Diprotodon. Carnivorous marsupials continued hunting in the Pliocene, including dasyurids, the dog-like thylacine and cat-like Thylacoleo. The first rodents arrived in Australia. The modern platypus, a monotreme, appeared.

Birds

The predatory South American phorusrhacids were rare in this time; among the last was Titanis, a large phorusrhacid that migrated to North America and rivaled mammals as top predator. Other birds probably evolved at this time, some modern (such as the genera Cygnus, Bubo, Struthio and Corvus), some now extinct.

Reptiles and amphibians
Alligators and crocodiles died out in Europe as the climate cooled. Venomous snake genera continued to increase as more rodents and birds evolved. Rattlesnakes first appeared in the Pliocene. The modern species Alligator mississippiensis, having evolved in the Miocene, continued into the Pliocene, except with a more northern range; specimens have been found in very late Miocene deposits of Tennessee. Giant tortoises still thrived in North America, with genera like Hesperotestudo. Madtsoid snakes were still present in Australia. The amphibian order Allocaudata became extinct.

Oceans

Oceans continued to be relatively warm during the Pliocene, though they continued cooling. The Arctic ice cap formed, drying the climate and increasing cool shallow currents in the North Atlantic. Deep cold currents flowed from the Antarctic.

The formation of the Isthmus of Panama about 3.5 million years ago cut off the final remnant of what was once essentially a circum-equatorial current that had existed since the Cretaceous and the early Cenozoic. This may have contributed to further cooling of the oceans worldwide.

The Pliocene seas were alive with sea cows, seals, sea lions and sharks.

Supernovae

In 2002, Narciso Benítez et al. calculated that roughly 2 million years ago, around the end of the Pliocene Epoch, a group of bright O and B stars called the Scorpius–Centaurus OB association passed within 130 light-years of Earth and that one or more supernova explosions gave rise to a feature known as the Local Bubble. Such a close explosion could have damaged the Earth's ozone layer and caused the extinction of some ocean life (at its peak, a supernova of this size could have the same absolute magnitude as an entire galaxy of 200 billion stars). Radioactive iron-60 isotopes that have been found in ancient seabed deposits further back this finding, as there are no natural sources for this radioactive isotope on Earth, but they can be produced in supernovae. Furthermore, iron-60 residues point to a huge spike 2.6 million years ago, but an excess scattered over 10 million years can also be found, suggesting that there may have been multiple, relatively close supernovae.

In 2019, researchers found more of these interstellar iron-60 isotopes in Antarctica, which have been associated with the Local Interstellar Cloud.

See also
 List of fossil sites (with link directory)

Notes

References

Further reading

 
 ; 2004: A Geologic Time Scale 2004, Cambridge University Press.

External links

 Mid-Pliocene Global Warming: NASA/GISS Climate Modeling
 Palaeos Pliocene
 PBS Change: Deep Time: Pliocene
 Possible Pliocene supernova
 "Supernova dealt deaths on Earth? Stellar blasts may have killed ancient marine life" Science News Online retrieved February 2, 2002
 UCMP Berkeley Pliocene Epoch Page
 Pliocene Microfossils: 100+ images of Pliocene Foraminifera
 Human Timeline (Interactive) – Smithsonian, National Museum of Natural History (August 2016).

 
Geological epochs
Neogene geochronology